Walnut Township is a township in Madison County, Iowa, in the United States.

History
Walnut Township was established in 1851.

References

Townships in Madison County, Iowa
Townships in Iowa
1851 establishments in Iowa